Epoetin beta (INN), sold under the brand name Neorecormon among others, is a synthetic, recombinant form of erythropoietin, a protein that promotes the production of red blood cells. It is an erythropoiesis-stimulating agent (ESA) that is used to treat anemia, commonly associated with chronic kidney failure and cancer chemotherapy.

It is on the World Health Organization's List of Essential Medicines.

Chemistry
Epoetin beta is a recombinant form of human erythropoietin which is produced in Chinese hamster ovary cells. It has the same protein sequence as natural human erythropoietin, being composed of 165 amino acids with about 30 KDa molecular weight.

History
Erythropoietin (EPO) is a hormone produced in the kidneys. The existence of this hormone has been known since 1906, when scientists first started isolating it, and since the 1980s, a recombinant version of the hormone has been available for use in medical treatment.

See also 
 Epoetin alfa
 Epoetin theta

References

Further reading

External links 
 

Antianemic preparations
Growth factors
Erythropoiesis-stimulating agents
Hoffmann-La Roche brands